Dead Gentlemen Productions is an independent film company based in Seattle, WA.

They have released a number of films, including the award-winning cult classic The Gamers, The Gamers: Dorkness Rising and The Gamers: Hands of Fate.

All of the films have featured "The Purple Ninja", a ninja wearing purple garbs who is mostly brutally killed during a fight scene. The character is credited as playing himself. While the website implies that The Purple Ninja is a real person of superhuman qualities, the special features for Gamers: Dorkness Rising reveal The Purple Ninja to be Nathan Rice.

Filmography
 Demon Hunters (1999)
 Demon Hunters: Dead Camper Lake (2000)
 The Gamers (2002)
 The Gamers: Dorkness Rising (2008)
 JourneyQuest (2010)
 S.J. Tucker “Playing D&D” Music Video (2011)
 JourneyQuest Season 2 (2012)
 The Gamers: Hands of Fate (2013)

External links
Official Site
podcast/interview w/ matt vancil

Film production companies of the United States